Uranagong is a locality in the Riverina district of New South Wales, Australia. It was the site of a now-closed railway station and siding between 1912 and 1950 on the Oaklands railway line. Although the disused rail-track is in place, no trace of the former station remains.

References

Towns in the Riverina
Towns in New South Wales